FC Einheit Rudolstadt is a German football club from Rudolstadt in the district of Saalfeld-Rudolstadt, Thuringia. The ground of the club is called Städtisches Stadion im Heinepark. Currently they play their second season in the NOFV-Oberliga Süd.

Club history
FC Einheit Rudolstadt was founded on 11 November 1950 as BSG Einheit Rudolstadt.  In 1957, Rudolstadt, together with Stahl Silbitz and Chemie Elsterberg, succeeded in promotion to the II. DDR-Liga. The then third highest division of the GDR proved to be too strong for the East Thuringians, so after only one season Einheit and Motor Gotha were relegated back to the Bezirksliga.

In the Bezirksliga, Einheit acted solely at the local level in the Gera district and was used for the training of young players of FC Carl Zeiss Jena. Between rises and drops from and to the Bezirksklasse in the next decades, Einheit regained its resurgence in the Bezirksliga Gera. Its progress was stalled by city rivals Chemie Schwarza who repeatedly managed to rise up to the DDR-Liga.

After German reunification in 1990 Einheit merged with the football section of Chemie Schwarza and was renamed FC Rudolstadt/Schwarza. In 1996 the two clubs de-merged, with Rudolstadt regaining the old name Einheit Rudolstadt and Schwarza rejoining SV Schwarza.
In 2012 Einheit finished 3rd in the Thüringenliga but was promoted to the NOFV-Oberliga Süd as 2nd placed Eintracht Sondershausen waived its promotion right.

First team squad 2014/15

Coaching staff
Head coach: Holger Jähnisch
Assistants: Thomas Rothe, Michael Schoke, René Just, Jörg Schneider

References

External links
 Official website 
 Das deutsche Fußball-Archiv Historical German football league tables 

Rudolstadt Einheit
Football clubs in East Germany
Football clubs in Thuringia
Association football clubs established in 1950
1950 establishments in East Germany
Rudolstadt
Sport in Thuringia